The 1954 San Diego State Aztecs football team represented San Diego State College during the 1954 college football season.

San Diego State competed in the California Collegiate Athletic Association (CCAA). The team was led by eighth-year head coach Bill Schutte, and played home games at both Aztec Bowl and Balboa Stadium. They finished the season with five wins and four losses (5–4, 2–2 CCAA). Overall, the team outscored its opponents 177–141 for the season.

Schedule

Team players in the NFL
The following San Diego State players were selected in the 1955 NFL Draft.

Notes

References

San Diego State
San Diego State Aztecs football seasons
San Diego State Aztecs football